A pasty is a British baked pastry.

Pasty or Pastie may also refer to:

 Pastie, a large, round patéd pie eaten in Northern Ireland
 Pasties, adhesive coverings applied to cover a person's nipples
 Pasty (horse), a racehorse
 Pasty Harris (born 1944), English cricketer (from Cornwall)
 a pale and unhealthy appearance; pallor
 an implementation of Pastebin

See also

 Pate (disambiguation)